Clupanodon thrissa, the Chinese gizzard shad, is a species of gizzard shad from the Northwest Pacific, occurring from Korea to Thailand and possibly the Philippines.  It is the only species currently recognized in its genus.

References

Clupeidae
Taxa named by Carl Linnaeus
Fish described in 1758
Monotypic ray-finned fish genera